Barry Bourke (born 14 September 1943) is a former Australian rules footballer who played for Melbourne in the Victorian Football League (VFL).

Bourke started his career in the forwardline, topping Melbourne's goalkicking with 48 goals in his debut season. Most of his subsequent games were spent in defence with the occasional stints up forward. He was a premiership player with Melbourne in 1964 and was a regular Victorian representative at interstate football.

External links

DemonWiki profile

1943 births
Living people
Australian rules footballers from Victoria (Australia)
Melbourne Football Club players
Melbourne Football Club Premiership players
One-time VFL/AFL Premiership players